Banora Point is a suburb located in the Northern Rivers region of New South Wales, Australia in Tweed Shire. Together with Tweed Heads South and Terranora it had a combined population of 27,368 in 2001, including 21,457 (78.4%) Australian-born persons and 525 (1.9%) indigenous persons.

The eastern boundary is aligned with the Tweed River.   There is a golf course in its centre and several islands along the river.  The Pacific Motorway passes through the eastern parts.  The town is largely suburban although it has also become a hub for small businesses with a growing industrial estate and shopping precincts. A number of schools, both public and Catholic, are also situated in the region.  Demographically, families and retirees account for much of its growing population.

See also 

Banora point high school

References 

Suburbs of Tweed Heads, New South Wales
Coastal towns in New South Wales